NGC 171 is a barred spiral galaxy with an apparent magnitude of 12, located around 3 million light-years away in the constellation Cetus. The galaxy has 2 main medium-wound arms, with a few minor arms, and a fairly bright nucleus and bulge. It was discovered on 20 October 1784 by William Herschel. It is also known as NGC 175.

See also 
 List of NGC objects (1–1000)

References

External links 
 
 SEDS

0171
Barred spiral galaxies
Cetus (constellation)
Astronomical objects discovered in 1784
Discoveries by William Herschel